Santiago Sochiapan is a municipality  located in the south of the Papaloapan zone in the central zone of the State of Veracruz, about 240 km from state capital Xalapa. It has a surface of 40.04 km2. The name comes from the language Náhuatl, Xochi-apa-tlan; that means “Place with blue flowers".

Geographic
The municipality of Santiago Sochiapan is bordered to the north and east by Playa Vicente and to the south and west by Oaxaca.

Agriculture
It produces principally maize, beans, green chile, watermelon, coffee and tomato.

Celebrations
Every May, a festival is held to celebrate Aposto Santiago, patron of the town and in December there is a festival held in honor of the Virgin of Guadalupe.

Climate
The weather in  Santiago Sochiapan is very cold and wet all year with rains in summer and autumn.

References

External links
 Municipal Official webpage
 Municipal Official Information

Municipalities of Veracruz